Carlos Alberto Batres González (born April 2, 1968 in Guatemala City) is a Guatemalan football referee. He has refereed FIFA World Cup qualification and final tournament matches, and at Olympic tournaments.

Having refereed in FIFA since January 1, 1996, Batres conducted his first international match on October 27, 1996, a 1998 World Cup qualifier between Panama and Canada.

He officiated at the 2002 FIFA World Cup, presiding over the Group A match between Denmark and Senegal and the second round match between Germany and Paraguay. He was also preselected as a referee for the 2010 FIFA World Cup.

On June 13, 2010, he refereed the match between Algeria and Slovenia, even though his mother had died barely four days before, on the night of June 9.

On June 20, 2010, he refereed the match between Italy and New Zealand, which ended in a 1–1 draw.

World Cup matches officiated

References

1968 births
Living people
Sportspeople from Guatemala City
Guatemalan football referees
2002 FIFA World Cup referees
2010 FIFA World Cup referees
CONCACAF Gold Cup referees
CONCACAF Champions League referees